Mucin-like protein 1 is a protein that in humans is encoded by the MUCL1 gene.

References

Further reading